Blastobasis aedes is a moth in the family Blastobasidae. It is found in Costa Rica.

The length of the forewings is 4.9–6.8 mm. The forewings are pale brown intermixed with a few brown scales. The hindwings are translucent pale brown or translucent pale brown, gradually darkening towards the apex.

Etymology
The specific name is derived from Latin aedes (meaning a building).

References

Moths described in 2013
Blastobasis
Moths of Central America